The Saab 9-X Air is a concept car created by the Saab Automobile. It was first shown at the 2008 Paris Motor Show. It is a convertible version of the Saab 9-X Biohybrid, with a canvas roof denominated "Canopy Top" by Saab. The car is a plug-in hybrid combining an E100 turbocharged engine giving  combined with two electric motors.

References 

All-wheel-drive vehicles
9-X Air
Plug-in hybrid vehicles